Queensbury station or variant, may refer to:

 Queensbury tube station, London, England, UK; a London Underground subway station
 Queensbury railway station, Queensbury, West Yorkshire, England, UK; a village train station
 "Queensbury Station" (song), a 1988 song by 'The Magoo Brothers' on their album Beyond Believable; see Metro-land

See also

 Queensbury (disambiguation)
 Station (disambiguation)